The Borneo Mission Association was founded in 1909 by Bishop W. R. Mounsey to assist the work of the Church of England in Labuan, Sarawak and British North Borneo.

It ceased operation in 2015, with its remaining funds transferred to the United Society.

See also 
Diocese of Kuching
Singapore and West Malaysia Diocesan Association
Church of the Province of South East Asia

References
The Chronicle: A Quarterly Report of the Borneo Mission Association (1910-1933)
Borneo Chronicle: Magazine of the Borneo Mission Association (1938-1978)

External links 
Photographs relating to the Borneo Mission Association
Two mission associations close - but Anglican Church in South East Asia marches on
Society for the Propagation of the Gospel Archives on Borneo Mission in Trinity Theological College, Singapore
Anglicanism in Sarawak/Borneo from Project Canterbury
Charity Commission for England and Wales Register

References

Church of England missions
Church of England missionary societies
Christian organizations established in 1909
Religious organizations disestablished in 2015